The brilliant arboreal alligator lizard (Abronia gaiophantasma) is a species of lizard endemic to Guatemala.

This species is restricted to the mountains of east-central Guatemala, from the Sierra de las Minas east to the Chilascó region. It occurs at elevations of 1,600–2,650 m, and can be found in pine–oak and cloud forests of lower montane wet forests. Its extent of occurrence is estimated at only 750 km2, and has been declared endangered. Threats to this species include habitat loss from agriculture, and the exportation of ornamental Chamaedaphne calyculata plants, conversion of habitats to pine plantations, and intentional fires. It can be found in protected areas such as Mario Dary Rivera Protected Biotope and Sierra de las Minas Biosphere Reserve.

References

Endangered animals
Abronia
Lizards of Central America
Reptiles of Guatemala
Endemic fauna of Guatemala
Reptiles described in 1993
Taxa named by Jonathan A. Campbell
Taxa named by Darrel Frost